"Ja a ty" ("Me and You" in English) is a 2011 song by Majk Spirit and Celeste Buckingham. As the first music collaboration of the Slovak recording artists, their common duet was released on Valentine's Day, February 14, 2012. Prior to that, the single was issued on the rapper's own studio album entitled Nový človek (2011), distributed by BeatBan Records.

The song charted at number forty-eight on the SK Top 100, while at number four on the local component airplay list, and its official music video was produced by DJ Lowa and Drahouš Lysák. In 2013, both artists worked together back again on a track called "I Was Wrong".

Credits and personnel
 Majk Spirit - lead vocalist, writer
 Celeste Buckingham - lead vocalist, writer
 Grimaso - producer
 Michal Matejovič - media management
 FatMusic Studio - recording studio
 BeatBan Records - record label, distributor
 Spirit Music - copyright
 OnStage Ltd. - distributor

Track listings
 "Ja a ty" (Album version) — 2:51

Charts

References
General

Specific

External links
 Amazon.com > "Ja a ty"
  MTV.cz > "Ja a ty" (Making of Music Video)

2011 songs
2012 singles
Celeste Buckingham songs
Songs written by Celeste Buckingham